The 24-hour news cycle (or 24/7 news cycle) is 24-hour investigation and reporting of news, concomitant with fast-paced lifestyles. The vast news resources available in recent decades have increased competition for audience and advertiser attention, prompting media providers to deliver the latest news in the most compelling manner in order to remain ahead of competitors. Television-, radio-, print-, online- and mobile app news media all have many suppliers that want to be relevant to their audiences and deliver news first.

A complete news cycle consists of the media reporting on some event, followed by the media reporting on public and other reactions to the earlier reports. The advent of 24-hour cable and satellite television news channels and, in more recent times, of news sources on the World Wide Web (including blogs), considerably shortened this process.

History
Although all-news radio operated for decades earlier, the 24-hour news cycle arrived with the advent of cable television channels dedicated to news and brought about a much faster pace of news production with an increased demand for stories that could be presented as continual news with constant updating. The O. J. Simpson murder case in 1994 and 1995 created the 24-hour news cycle and ushered in the era of cable news. This was a contrast with the day-by-day pace of the news cycle of printed daily newspapers. A high premium on faster reporting would see a further increase with the advent of online news.

Critical assessment
According to former journalists Bill Kovach and Tom Rosenstiel, 24-hour news creates wild competition among media organizations for audience share. This, coupled with the profit demand of their corporate ownership, has led to a decline in journalistic standards. In their book Warp Speed: America in the Age of Mixed Media, they write that "the press has moved toward sensationalism, entertainment, and opinion" and away from traditional values of verification, proportion, relevance, depth, and quality of interpretation. They fear these values will be replaced by a "journalism of assertion" which de-emphasizes whether a claim is valid and encourages putting a claim into the arena of public discussion as quickly as possible.

See also

CNN effect
Feiler faster thesis
Information overload
Information pollution
Infotainment

References

Further reading
 

News media manipulation
Influence of mass media